Calandra elegans is a species of beetles in the weevil family, the Curculionidae.

References

External links 

 Calandra elegans at insectoid.info

Dryophthorinae
Beetles described in 1789